Bubble Hits Ireland was a short-lived Irish owned digital television music channel operated by Creative Sounds. Bubble Hits Ireland aim to be a much-needed platform for Irish bands and artists to showcase their music alongside the current programming and music structure of Bubble Hits. It was the first 24/7 Irish music TV station. On 13 February 2009, Bubble Hits went off air and was removed from most of the TV EPGs. The websites, including the official one and social networking versions on MySpace and Bebo were also removed. The closure of the channel was due to the current downturn in advertising revenue.

History 
Bubble Hits Ireland was originally scheduled to be launched in October 2007, but instead was launched on 19 May 2008.

Location 

The company and its studios are located in Ashbourne, County Meath, Ireland. They also have studios based in London, UK. The channel is broadcast free-to-air, therefore viewers do not need to have a Sky subscription to view the channel. Despite being Irish-owned, it is not licensed by the Broadcasting Commission of Ireland (BCI) but instead by the UK's Ofcom to "Creative Sounds UK", who are based in Northchapel.

Availability 

The channel was carried by Sky Digital, UPC Ireland, Magnet Entertainment, Smart Vision and SCTV. It was also expected that the channel would air on the Irish digital terrestrial television service launching in Autumn 2009.

Former shows on Bubble Hits 

Chartshows
Bubble Euro Top 30 – The official European Top 30 chart, videos selected from 11 European countries.
Bubble Hits Irish Top 30 – The official Irish Top 30, featuring the top 30 videos from the highest selling singles of the week.

Playlists
Poptastic Hits – The latest pop hits
iBubble – interactive request show
Bubble Fresh – brand new video show  sponsored by iMTV
Pop Pop Pop – non-stop pop video show sponsored by Ryanair.com
Most Wanted – daily chart show of the highest requested songs of the day.

News an entertainment
Glenda's Showbiz Gossip – nightly entertainment news updates every night from 18:00 - 22:00.

Specialist programming
Bubble Hits at Oxegen 2008
Live at the Marque

Former presenters 
Glenda Gilson
Liam McKenna

References 

 Irish Examiner Weekend edition (04.08.2007) ‘Bubble Up’ (article)

External links 
Official Site Archived
Bubble Hits' page on MySpace, Now inactive and been removed

Television channels and stations established in 2008
Television channels and stations disestablished in 2009
Television stations in Ireland
Music television channels
Music organisations based in Ireland